The 1928 Iowa State Cyclones football team represented Iowa State College of Agricultural and Mechanic Arts (later renamed Iowa State University) in the Big Six Conference during the 1928 college football season. In their third season under head coach C. Noel Workman, the Cyclones compiled a 2–5–1 record (2–2–1 against conference opponents), finished in fourth place in the conference, and were outscored by opponents by a combined total of 67 to 39. They played their home games at State Field in Ames, Iowa.

Harry Lindblom was the team captain. Paul Trauger was selected as a first-team all-conference player.

Schedule

References

Iowa State
Iowa State Cyclones football seasons
Iowa State Cyclones football